The 2019–20 season was Standard Liège's 116th season in existence and the club's 8th consecutive season in the top flight of Belgian football. In addition to the domestic league, Standard Liège participated in this season's editions of the Belgian Cup and the UEFA Europa League. The season covered the period from 1 July 2019 to 30 June 2020.

Players

Current squad

Out of first team

Out on loan

Competitions

Overview

Belgian Division

Regular season

League table

Results summary

Results by round

Matches
On 2 April 2020, the Jupiler Pro League's board of directors proposed to cancel the season due to the COVID-19 pandemic. The General Assembly accepted the proposal on 15 May, and officially ended the 2019–20 season.

Belgian Cup

UEFA Europa League

Group stage

Statistics

Squad appearances and goals
Last updated on 7 March 2020.

|-
! colspan=14 style=background:#dcdcdc; text-align:center|Goalkeepers

|-
! colspan=14 style=background:#dcdcdc; text-align:center|Defenders

|-
! colspan=14 style=background:#dcdcdc; text-align:center|Midfielders

|-
! colspan=14 style=background:#dcdcdc; text-align:center|Forwards

|-
! colspan=14 style=background:#dcdcdc; text-align:center|Players who have made an appearance this season but have left the club

|}

References

Standard Liège seasons
Standard Liège
2019–20 UEFA Europa League participants seasons